The Safavid dynasty was one of Iran's most significant ruling dynasties reigning from 1501 to 1736. Their rule is often considered the beginning of modern Iranian history, as well as one of the gunpowder empires. The Safavid Shāh Ismā'īl I established the Twelver denomination of Shīʿa Islam as the official religion of the Persian Empire, marking one of the most important turning points in the history of Islam. The Safavid dynasty had its origin in the Safavid order of Sufism, which was established in the city of Ardabil in the Iranian Azerbaijan region. It was an Iranian dynasty of Kurdish origin, but during their rule they intermarried with Turkoman, Georgian, Circassian, and Pontic Greek dignitaries, nevertheless they were Turkish-speaking and Turkified. From their base in Ardabil, the Safavids established control over parts of Greater Iran and reasserted the Iranian identity of the region, thus becoming the first native dynasty since the Sasanian Empire to establish a national state officially known as Iran.

The Safavids ruled from 1501 to 1722 (experiencing a brief restoration from 1729 to 1736 and 1750 to 1773) and, at their height, they controlled all of what is now Iran, Republic of Azerbaijan, Bahrain, Armenia, eastern Georgia, parts of the North Caucasus including Russia, Iraq, Kuwait, and Afghanistan, as well as parts of Turkey, Syria, Pakistan, Turkmenistan, and Uzbekistan.
 
Despite their demise in 1736, the legacy that they left behind was the revival of Iran as an economic stronghold between East and West, the establishment of an efficient state and bureaucracy based upon "checks and balances", their architectural innovations, and patronage for fine arts. The Safavids have also left their mark down to the present era by establishing Twelver Shīʿīsm as the state religion of Iran, as well as spreading Shīʿa Islam in major parts of the Middle East, Central Asia, Caucasus, Anatolia, the Persian Gulf, and Mesopotamia.

Genealogy—ancestors of the Safavids and its multi-cultural identity

The Safavid Kings themselves claimed to be sayyids, family descendants of the Islamic prophet Muhammad, although many scholars have cast doubt on this claim. There seems now to be a consensus among scholars that the Safavid family hailed from Iranian Kurdistan, and later moved to Iranian Azerbaijan, finally settling in the 11th century CE at Ardabil. Traditional pre-1501 Safavid manuscripts trace the lineage of the Safavids to the Kurdish dignitary, Firuz-Shah Zarrin-Kolah.

According to historians, including Vladimir Minorsky and Roger Savory, the Safavids were of Turkicized Iranian origin:

By the time of the establishment of the Safavid empire, the members of the family were Turkicized and Turkish-speaking, and some of the Shahs composed poems in their then-native Turkish language. Concurrently, the Shahs themselves also supported Persian literature, poetry and art projects including the grand Shahnameh of Shah Tahmasp, while members of the family and some Shahs composed Persian poetry as well.

The authority of the Safavids was religiously based, and their claim to legitimacy was founded on being direct male descendants of Ali, the cousin and son-in-law of Muhammad, and regarded by the Shiʻa as the first Imam.

Furthermore, the dynasty was from the very start thoroughly intermarried with both Pontic Greek as well as Georgian lines. In addition, from the official establishment of the dynasty in 1501, the dynasty would continue to have many intermarriages with both Circassian as well as again Georgian dignitaries, especially with the accession of Tahmasp I.

Safavid Shahs of Iran

Ismail I 1501–1524
Tahmasp I 1524–1576
Ismail II 1576–1578
Mohammad Khodabanda 1578–1587
Abbas I 1587–1629
Safi 1629–1642
Abbas II 1642–1666
Suleiman I 1666–1694
Soltan Hoseyn 1694–1722
Tahmasp II 1722–1732
Abbas III 1732–1736

Mothers of Safavid Shahs

Culture
The Safavid family was a literate family from its early origin. There are extant Tati and Persian poetry from Shaykh Safi ad-din Ardabili as well as extant Persian poetry from Shaykh Sadr ad-din. Most of the extant poetry of Shah Ismail I is in Azerbaijani pen-name of Khatai. Sam Mirza, the son of Shah Ismail as well as some later authors assert that Ismail composed poems both in Turkish and Persian but only a few specimens of his Persian verse have survived. A collection of his poems in Azeri were published as a Divan. Shah Tahmasp who has composed poetry in Persian was also a painter, while Shah Abbas II was known as a poet, writing Azerbaijani verses. Sam Mirza, the son of Ismail I was himself a poet and composed his poetry in Persian. He also compiled an anthology of contemporary poetry.

See also
Khanates of the Caucasus
List of Shi'a Muslim dynasties
Persianate states
Safavid art
Safavid conversion of Iran to Shia Islam
Trade in Iran's Safavid era

References

Bibliography

Further reading
 Christoph Marcinkowski (tr.), Persian Historiography and Geography: Bertold Spuler on Major Works Produced in Iran, the Caucasus, Central Asia, India and Early Ottoman Turkey, Singapore: Pustaka Nasional, 2003, .
 Christoph Marcinkowski (tr., ed.), Mirza Rafi‘a's Dastur al-Muluk: A Manual of Later Safavid Administration. Annotated English Translation, Comments on the Offices and Services, and Facsimile of the Unique Persian Manuscript, Kuala Lumpur, ISTAC, 2002, .
 Christoph Marcinkowski, From Isfahan to Ayutthaya: Contacts between Iran and Siam in the 17th Century, Singapore, Pustaka Nasional, 2005, .
 "The Voyages and Travels of the Ambassadors", Adam Olearius, translated by John Davies (1662),

External links

History of the Safavids on Iran Chamber
"Safavid dynasty", Encyclopædia Iranica by Rudi Matthee
 The History Files: Rulers of Persia
BBC History of Religion
Iranian culture and history site
"Georgians in the Safavid administration", Encyclopædia Iranica
Artistic and cultural history of the Safavids from the Metropolitan Museum of Art
History of Safavid art
A Study of the Migration of Shiʻi Works from Arab Regions to Iran at the Early Safavid Era.
Why is Safavid history important? (Iran Chamber Society)
Historiography During the Safawid Era
"IRAN ix. RELIGIONS IN IRAN (2) Islam in Iran (2.3) Shiʿism in Iran Since the Safavids: Safavid Period", Encyclopædia Iranica by Hamid Algar

 
Safavid Iran
Iranian dynasties
Iranian Muslim dynasties
Monarchy in Persia and Iran
Early Modern history of Georgia (country)
Early Modern history of Armenia
Early Modern history of Azerbaijan
History of Dagestan
Early Modern history of Iraq
1501 establishments in Asia